South Korean rapper Mino released three studio albums, twelve singles as a lead-artist and thirteen as a featured-artist. Mino started his career as a member of the ballad group BoM in July 2011 under the name Tagoon. The group disbanded in 2013 and Mino auditioned for YG Entertainment, where he was promptly accepted. He debuted as a member of South Korean boyband Winner on August 12, 2014, with the studio album 2014 S/S. The album included Mino's first solo track, "I'm Him". While not released as a single, the song peaked at number 15 on South Korea's Gaon Digital Chart, selling 280,000 paid digital downloads.

In summer 2015, Mino participated in Show Me the Money 4, a South Korean rap competition TV show that aired on Mnet. The show spawned four singles—"Turtle Ship", "Money Flow", "Okey Dokey" and "Fear", with the latter featuring Big Bang's Taeyang. All four reached the top ten of the Gaon Digital Chart, with "Fear" peaking at number three. Furthermore, "Fear" became his first song to enter the Billboard World Digital Song Sales chart at number four. In September 2016, Mino and fellow rapper Bobby released their first collaborative extended play under the alias MOBB. The EP was supported by four singles, including the solo single "Body" which peaked at number 13 on the Gaon Digital Chart and sold 186,000 digital copies. 

Mino's debut studio album XX was announced on September 13, 2018, and released on November 26 alongside the single "Fiancé". The single debuted and spent an additional week a top the Gaon Digital Chart, making it his first song to do so. As of February 2019, XX has sold more than 75,000 copies in South Korea. His second studio album Take was released on October 30, 2020. The album debuted at number four on the Gaon Album Chart, selling more than 100,000 copies in its release month.

Studio albums

Singles

As a lead artist

Promotional single

Collaborations

As a featured artist

Other charted songs

Soundtrack appearances

Guest appearances

Production credits 
All song credits are adapted from the Korea Music Copyright Association's database unless stated otherwise.

Solo work

Work as Winner

Other artists

Videography

Music videos

See also 
 Winner discography

Notes

References

Discographies of South Korean artists
Hip hop discographies
YG Entertainment artists